The Praça Raul Soares is a major square of Belo Horizonte. Built in French style, it is situated at the confluence of four major avenues: Amazonas, Augusto de Lima, Bias Fortes and Olegário Maciel. The square is named in honor of the former governor of Minas Gerais, Raul Soares de Moura. 

In 2008, the square underwent revitalization that was funded through the municipal Participatory Budgeting program and cost the equivalent of $2,600,000 U.S. dollars. The flowerbeds, sidewalks, large fountain and drinking fountains were restored. The project aimed to give more security and accessibility to the flow of pedestrians. Compromised trees were replaced, lampposts were resized, and advertisements were removed or adjusted in accordance with the appropriate codes. The walks were improved to provide easy access for the disabled and the visually impaired.

Praça Raul Soares is listed by IEPHA (Instituto Estadual do Patrimônio Histórico e Artístico de Minas Gerais) and therefore cannot be redeveloped, just restored.

Geography of Belo Horizonte
Parks in Brazil
Tourist attractions in Belo Horizonte